Mordellistena bangueyensis is a beetle in the genus Mordellistena of the family Mordellidae. It was described in 1941 by Píc.

References

bangueyensis
Beetles described in 1941